Chelydropsis is an extinct genus in the family of snapping turtle that lived from the Oligocene to the Pliocene in Asia and Europe.

Species
 Chelydropsis aubasi
 Chelydropsis apellanizi
 Chelydropsis decheni
 Chelydropsis kusnetzovi
 Chelydropsis manuascensis
 Chelydropsis murchisoni
 Chelydropsis sansaniensis

References 

 Romer, Alfred Sherwood (Jan. 1 1997). The Osteology of the Reptiles. Reprint edition. Krieger Pub. Co. pp. 800.

Chelydridae
Oligocene turtles
Miocene turtles
Pliocene turtles
Oligocene reptiles of Asia
Oligocene reptiles of Europe
Miocene reptiles of Asia
Miocene reptiles of Europe
Pliocene reptiles of Asia
Pliocene reptiles of Europe
Prehistoric turtles of Asia
Prehistoric turtle genera
Taxa named by Wilhelm Peters
Fossil taxa described in 1868